"Waterline" is a song by Irish pop duo Jedward. It was written by Swedish songwriter Nick Jarl and Swedish-based American songwriter Sharon Vaughn. It is best known as Ireland's entry at the Eurovision Song Contest 2012 held in Baku, Azerbaijan.

Background
In early 2012, "Waterline" was chosen as the song for Jedward in their bid to represent Ireland at Eurovision 2012.  The song was first broadcast on Mooney on 9 February 2012 alongside the other four songs against which it was to compete in the national final. It was then performed on the Irish national final on 24 February 2012. Performed fifth out of five songs, it was announced as the winner at the end of the show.  The song qualified for the Eurovision final from the first semi-final, coming in 6th place of the 10 qualifiers. The song eventually finished in 19th place with 46 points. In June 2012, "Waterline" was listed as the opening track of Jedward's Young Love album.

"Waterline" was included in music blog Popjustice's Top 45 Singles of 2012 list.

Music videos 
Two music videos were made for "Waterline". The first was the official Eurovision version, required as part of the competition entry. It consisted of footage of Jedward performing the song at the Late Late Show, including backstage footage. The second video was made by John and Edward themselves in Tokyo. It shows the twins in various Tokyo locations, including the Sensō-ji temple and the Shibuya district.

Track listing
 Digital download / CD single
 "Waterline" - 3:01
 "Waterline" (Instrumental) - 3:01

Chart performance

References

2012 songs
Eurovision songs of 2012
Eurovision songs of Ireland
Jedward songs
Songs written by Sharon Vaughn
Universal Music Group singles
Songs written by Nick Jarl